Princess Konstancja Poniatowska (1759–1830) was a Polish noblewoman, niece of king Stanisław August Poniatowski.

Konstancja was the daughter of Kazimierz Poniatowski and Apolonia Ustrzycka, and married Ludwik Skumin Tyszkiewicz on April 4, 1775 in Warsaw. She was one of the closest friends of the French Minister of Foreign Affairs, Charles Maurice de Talleyrand-Périgord.

1759 births
1830 deaths
Konstancja Poniatowska
Konstancja Poniatowska